Blair Venn is an Australian actor who has played roles in theatre and television.

Career
Venn played the role of Garrett Quinn in the television series Head Start.  He has also appeared in two short stints on the Australian soap opera Neighbours as Brendan Bell  and Richard Aaronow. Both of Venn's characters in neighbours were killed off. On 8 November 2001, Debi Enker from The Age reported that Venn had been cast in a telemovie titled "Life". In 2003, Venn carried out theatrical work in the plays "The Fay Boy" and "Uncle Vanya". In 2006, he worked on a stage productions titled "Some Explicit Polaroids" and "Dinner with Friends".

His other television credits include Satisfaction, All Saints, White Collar Blue, Stingers and Farscape.

References

External links

Australian male television actors
Living people
Year of birth missing (living people)